The Hyderabad cricket team is a domestic cricket team based in the city of Hyderabad, Telangana, run by the Hyderabad Cricket Association. It is part of the Ranji Trophy Elite Group and has seen scattered success over its many years in the Ranji Trophy circuit. Over its long history in the Ranji Trophy it has won twice and come runner up three times and has made one appearance in the Irani Trophy.

Competition history
Hyderabad was the third team in the history of the Ranji Trophy to win the tournament, when it did so in the 1937/38 tournament, beating defending champions Nawanagar in a nailbiting one wicket victory. However, it wouldn't be until 1943 that it would appear in another final and this time, it was thrashed comprehensively by a strong Baroda. In 1965 it lost to the Mumbai cricket team and in doing so, failed to break the famous Mumbai winning streak in the 1960s (Mumbai won every year in the 1960s). Its next taste of success was in 1987, where it beat Delhi through first innings lead. It also appeared in the 2000 final but, once again, was unable to beat Mumbai.

This made up for one appearance in the Irani Trophy, in which it faced up against a 1987 Rest of India side. The match was drawn and Hyderabad won based on its 27-run first innings lead. This was after it was awarded 16-penalty runs for slow over rate on behalf of the Rest of India team. See Scorecard

Performance 
 Ranji Trophy
 Winners (2): 1937–38, 1986–87
 Runners-up (3): 1942–43, 1964–65, 1999–2000
 Irani Cup
 Winners: 1987–88
 Syed Mushtaq Ali Trophy
 Runners-up (1): 2009–10

In all first-class matches to the end of the 2013–14 season, Hyderabad had played 389 times, with 135 wins, 74 losses and 180 draws.

Famous players

Players from Telangana who have played Test cricket for India, along with year of Test debut:

 Ghulam Ahmed (1949)
 Motganhalli Jaisimha (1959)
 Abbas Ali Baig (1959)
 Syed Abid Ali (1967)
 Kenia Jayantilal (1971)
 Pochiah Krishnamurthy (1971)
 Madireddy Venkat Narasimha Rao (1979)
 Shivlal Yadav (1979)
 Mohammad Azharuddin (1985)
 Arshad Ayub (1987)
 Venkatapathy Raju (1990)
 Vangipurapu Venkata Sai Laxman (VVS Laxman) (1996)
 Pragyan Ojha (2009)
 Mohammad Siraj (2020)

Players from Telangana who have played ODI but not Test cricket for India, along with year of ODI debut :
 Noel David (1997)
 Ambati Rayudu (2013)

Current squad 
Players with international caps are listed in bold.

Updated as on 24 January 2023

Coaching staff

 Head Coach: J. Arunkumar
 Assistant Coach: Narender Pal Singh
 Physio: Bheeshm Pratap Singh
 Trainer: A Naveen Reddy
 Video Analyst: Santosh BM
 Consultant: VVS Laxman, Venkatapathy Raju

In popular culture
 Hyderabad cricket team was featured in the Jersey, a 2019 fictional sports drama film. In which the main protagonist Arjun played by Nani, plays for this team in Ranji Trophy of 1980s, 1996-97 season.

See also

 Sport in India- overview of sport in India
 Cricket in India
 Sunrisers Hyderabad
 Deccan Chargers

References

External links
Hyderabad cricket team official site

Indian first-class cricket teams
Cricket in Hyderabad, India
Cricket in Telangana
1931 establishments in India
Cricket clubs established in 1931